Stonehouse railway station served the village of Stonehouse, in the historical county of Lanarkshire, Scotland, from 1866 to 1965 on the Lesmahagow Railway.

History 
The station was opened on 1 December 1866 by the Caledonian Railway. It initially only had one platform. The goods yard was to the south. It had a signal box, which opened in 1893, closed in 1905 when the station was resited. The resited station had 4 platforms, new station buildings and a stone-built goods shed. The goods yard closed in 1964. The station closed on 4 October 1965.

References 

Disused railway stations in South Lanarkshire
Former Caledonian Railway stations
Beeching closures in Scotland
Railway stations in Great Britain opened in 1866
Railway stations in Great Britain closed in 1965
1866 establishments in Scotland
1965 disestablishments in Scotland